"Scotland the Brave" is a Scottish patriotic song, one of three often considered an unofficial Scottish national anthem (the others being "Flower of Scotland", and "Scots Wha Hae").

History
The tune probably originated in the late 19th century. The earliest known printing of the tune was in the Utah Musical Bouquet, January 1878, and the earliest known version printed in Scotland is in The National Choir, 1891.

The lyrics commonly used now were written about 1950 by Scottish journalist Clifford Leonard Clark "Cliff" Hanley for singer Robert Wilson as part of an arrangement by Marion McClurg. Another set of lyrics also often heard were sung by Canadian singer John Charles McDermott; they are closely based on the poem "Let Italy Boast" by James Hyslop, which was first published in 1821 in The Edinburgh Magazine. However, Hyslop intended his poem to be sung to the melody of Sir Walter Scott of Abbotsford, 1st Baronet's "Boat Song" from "The Lady of the Lake" and not "Scotland the Brave".

"Scotland the Brave" is also the authorised pipe band march of the British Columbia Dragoons of the Canadian Armed Forces. 

"Scotland the Brave" was played before matches involving the Scotland national football team at the 1982, 1986, and 1990 FIFA World Cups. "Flower of Scotland" was subsequently adopted by Scotland for use at FIFA-sponsored events, after its usage by the Scottish rugby union team.

In June 2006, the song rated second in an online poll with more than 10,000 votes to determine Scotland's favourite unofficial anthem, losing only to "Flower of Scotland". The song was used to represent Scotland in the Commonwealth Games until it was replaced by "Flower of Scotland" from the 2010 games onwards.

In popular culture 

 Pro wrestler "Rowdy" Roddy Piper used the song as his entrance music throughout his career. He also performed the song on the bagpipes, alongside the Balmoral Highlanders, at WWF's SummerSlam '92 held in Wembley Stadium.
 The song is often played on bagpipes at New York Police Department funerals.
 In the 1968 movie The Devil's Brigade, composer Alex North uses the melody as the beginning for the opening theme, and with variations, throughout the film score; the song is played by the bagpipers of the Canadian component of the 1st Special Service Force when they march into Fort William Henry Harrison to the disbelief of their US counterparts.
 In the 1970 movie Patton, the song is played by the band of the British Eighth Army in a victory parade through the streets of Messina, led by General Bernard Law Montgomery, before discovering that General George S. Patton and his Seventh US Army were already there to meet him.  After a short exchange between the rival commanders, "Scotland the Brave" is struck up again, but is then symbolically drowned out by the American band's rendition of "The Stars and Stripes Forever."
 The Dropkick Murphys song "Cadence to Arms" from their debut album Do or Die is a reworking of "Scotland the Brave"'s melody.
 A comic version by The Corries mixes humorous and topical lyrics.
 The Church of Jesus Christ of Latter-day Saints hymn "Praise to the Man" is set to the tune of "Scotland the Brave". 
 The first verse and chorus of Hanley's version are sung a cappella in Stuart Ross' 1990 musical movie Forever Plaid.
 The Scottish ITV television station Grampian Television used the first eight notes of the song in its logo identifications (or "idents") during its first three decades of broadcasting.

References

British military marches
Scottish patriotic songs
National symbols of Scotland
Royal Regiment of Scotland
Scotland national football team songs
British anthems
Compositions for bagpipe